Eloy Guerrero Asensio (born 26 March 1962 in Barcelona) is a track and field athlete from Spain.  He has a disability and is a T42 type athlete.  He competed at the 1976 Summer Paralympics, winning a silver medal in one race.

References

External links 
 
 

Spanish male sprinters
Living people
1962 births
Paralympic silver medalists for Spain
Athletes from Barcelona
Athletes (track and field) at the 1976 Summer Paralympics
Sprinters with limb difference
Paralympic athletes of Spain
Male competitors in athletics with disabilities
Paralympic medalists in athletics (track and field)
Medalists at the 1976 Summer Paralympics
Paralympic sprinters